The British Committee for the Reunification of the Parthenon Marbles (BCRPM) is a group of British people who support the return of the Parthenon (Elgin) marbles to Athens, Greece.

Further reading

 Tom Flynn, The Universal Museum (Lulu, 2012)
 Christopher Hitchens, The Parthenon Marbles: A Case for Reunification (with a preface by Nadine Gordimer and essays by Robert Browning and Charalambos Bouras) (Verso, May 2008)
 Dorothy King, The Elgin Marbles (Hutchinson, January 2006)
 Mary Beard, The Parthenon (Profile Books, 2004) 
 Jeanette Greenfield The Return of Cultural Treasures (Cambridge University Press 2007) 
 Ian Jenkins, The Parthenon Frieze (British Museum Press, 2002)
 William St Clair, Lord Elgin and the Marbles (Oxford University Press, 1998)

See also
 Acropolis Museum
 Parthenon
 Elgin Marbles

External links
 Official Web Site
 Acropolis Museum, Athens
 The British Museum Parthenon pages
 The Adair Letter

Organisations that support the cause
 Melina Mercouri Foundation
 Bring Them Back (youtube video)
 Acropolis of Athens

Art and cultural repatriation
Organizations established in 1983
Cultural organisations based in the United Kingdom
Greece–United Kingdom relations
Elgin Marbles